Cristian Andrés Chocho León (born 4 November 1983) is an Ecuadorian race walker who competes in both the 20 km and 50 km walk events. He is the South American record holder in the 50 km (3:49:32 hours) and 20,000 metres (1:20:23.8 hours) walking events.

Chocho was the 2011 South American Champion over 20 km and was the bronze medallist at the 2011 Summer Universiade. His best global level finish is eleventh over 50 km at the 2011 World Championships in Athletics. He represented Ecuador at four Summer Olympics, won a gold medal in 50 km Walk in the 2015 Toronto Pan Am Games, and is a seven-time participant of the IAAF World Race Walking Cup.

Career
Born in Cuenca, Ecuador (the same city as 1996 Olympic racewalk champion Jefferson Pérez), he began racewalking at a young age and made his international debut at 15 years old. He took third in both the youth 10 km at the 1999 South American Racewalking Cup and the 10,000 m walk at the 1999 South American Junior Championships in Athletics. The year after he improved to second at the youth section of the South American Cup, but was disqualified for lifting at the 2000 South American Junior Championships. In spite of this he was chosen to compete at the 2000 World Junior Championships in Athletics held in Santiago de Chile and came 24th. He ended the year with a win over 10,000 m at the 2000 South American Youth Championships in Athletics.

The 2001 South American Junior Championships in Athletics were held in conjunction with the 2001 Pan American Junior Athletics Championships in October and he won the South American 10,000 m walk title, while finishing second in the Pan American race behind Mexico's Horacio Nava. Later that month he won the 10 km junior road title at the South American Cup. In his final year of junior competition he was runner-up to Brazil's Rafael Duarte in the 2002 South American Junior Championships and placed eighteenth in the 10,000 m walk at the 2002 World Junior Championships in Athletics. That year also marked his senior debut at the 2002 IAAF World Race Walking Cup, where he took 34th place in the 20 km walk category, as well as a tenth-place finish at the South American Cup.

Chocho did not compete in major competition in 2003 but returned in 2004 he placed fifth in the South American Cup. He was disqualified at the IAAF World Race Walking Cup in both 2004 and 2006. He set a personal best of 1:22:31 hours for the 20 km walk at the Na Rynek Marsz meet in June 2007, but managed only 13th place at the 2007 Summer Universiade and was again disqualified at the 2007 World Championships in Athletics. He came ninth at the 2008 South American Race Walking Cup and managed finishes of 38th and 39th at the 2008 Beijing Olympics and the 2008 IAAF World Race Walking Cup, respectively. He also improved his best to 1:22:05 hours at that year's Na Rynek Marsz meet. His highlights of 2009 were a twelfth-place finish at the 2009 Summer Universiade and 39th place at the 2009 World Championships in Athletics.

Chocho was disqualified at the 2010 South American Cup, but managed 31st at the 2010 IAAF World Race Walking Cup. He debuted over the 50 km walk distance that October and set a time of 3:54:42 hours in Congers, New York. The 2011 season saw Chocho reach new heights in his career. He began with a win at the national championships, but failed to finish at the 2011 Pan American Race Walking Cup. He rebounded with a near-personal best of 1:22:18 hours to take eighth at Rio Maior's Grande Premio Internacional en Marcha Atletica. That June he broke the South American record for the 20,000 m walk at the 2011 South American Championships in Athletics, winning the gold medal in a time of 1:20:23.8 hours. He followed this with a bronze medal performance at the 2011 Summer Universiade.

Making his championship debut over the distance, Chocho proved himself more adept at the longer distance and took eleventh place at the 2011 World Championships in Athletics with a South American record time of 3:49:32 hours. He ended the year at the 2011 Pan American Games, but was disqualified in the 50 km walk event. He competed at the 2012 Summer Olympics but was disqualified just beyond an hour into the 50 km race having been shown three red cards.

In 2019, he competed in the men's 20 kilometres walk at the 2019 World Athletics Championships held in Doha, Qatar. He finished in 18th place. He also competed in the men's 50 kilometres walk. He did not finish his race.

Chocho represented Ecuador in the men's 50 kilometres walk at the 2020 Summer Olympics, finishing 19th with a season best.

Personal life

Andres Chocho is the son of the olympic trainer, Luis Chocho (born 1957 in Cuenca Ecuador, died February 17, 2021, due to the complications for the COVID-19 disease to the age of 64 years old).

He is married to a Brazilian race walker, Érica de Sena.

Personal bests

Track walk
10,000 m: 40:29.71 min (ht) – Cuenca, Ecuador, 21 March 2016
20,000 m: 1:20:23.8 hrs (ht) – Buenos Aires, Argentina, 5 June 2011

Road walk
20 km: 1:20:07 hrs – Rome, Italy, 7 May 2016
50 km: 3:42:57 hrs NR– Ciudad Juárez, Mexico, 6 March 2016

International competitions

References

External links

Living people
1983 births
People from Cuenca, Ecuador
Ecuadorian male racewalkers
Olympic athletes of Ecuador
Athletes (track and field) at the 2008 Summer Olympics
Athletes (track and field) at the 2012 Summer Olympics
Athletes (track and field) at the 2016 Summer Olympics
Pan American Games gold medalists for Ecuador
Pan American Games medalists in athletics (track and field)
Athletes (track and field) at the 2011 Pan American Games
Athletes (track and field) at the 2015 Pan American Games
Athletes (track and field) at the 2019 Pan American Games
World Athletics Championships athletes for Ecuador
Universiade medalists in athletics (track and field)
Athletes (track and field) at the 2018 South American Games
South American Games silver medalists for Ecuador
South American Games medalists in athletics
Universiade medalists for Ecuador
Medalists at the 2011 Summer Universiade
Medalists at the 2015 Pan American Games
South American Games gold medalists in athletics
Athletes (track and field) at the 2020 Summer Olympics
South American Championships in Athletics winners
21st-century Ecuadorian people